Giorgio Cornaro or Giorgio Corner (1658–1722) was a Roman Catholic cardinal and member of the Cornaro family.

Biography
On 11 May 1692, he was consecrated bishop by Giambattista Rubini, Bishop of Vicenza, with Lorenzo Trotti, Bishop of Pavia, and Gregorio Giuseppe Gaetani de Aragonia, Titular Archbishop of Neocaesarea in Ponto, serving as co-consecrators.

Episcopal succession
While bishop, he was the principal consecrator of: 
Denis Delfino (patriarch) (Dionisio Dolfin), Titular Bishop of Lorea and Coadjutor Patriarch of Aquileia (1698);
Angelo Maria Carlini, Titular Archbishop of Corinthus (1703);
Pietro Barbarigo, Patriarch of Venice (1706); and
Sergio Pola, Titular Bishop of Famagusta (1706).

References

1658 births
1722 deaths
18th-century Italian cardinals
Apostolic Nuncios to Portugal
Giorgio